An independence referendum was held in Azerbaijan on 29 December 1991, three days after the collapse of the Soviet Union. The result was 99.8% in favour, with turnout reported to be 95.3%.

Results

References

Dissolution of the Soviet Union
Azerbaijan
1991 in Azerbaijan
Azerbaijan
1991
Referendums in the Soviet Union